Eva Julia Neer (1937–2000) was an American physician (Columbia University P&S), biochemist, and cell-biology scientist who gained U.S. national research awards (FASEB, 1987; American Heart Association, 1996) for her discoveries on G-protein subunit structure and function. She described the physiological roles of these subunits as an integrated and versatile molecular system of signal transduction for membrane-receptor regulation of cell function. Her research concepts turned her into a world leader in G-protein studies and impinged widely on the general understanding of cell behavior.

Biography

Born Eva Augenblick in Warsaw, came to New York at age eight with her parents and grew up in Queens and Scarsdale. Neer's family fled Warsaw at war's onset in 1939, emigrated first to Brazil, and soon after to the U.S.. In Warsaw, her father had practiced private corporate law, which he was unable to pursue in the US, but her parents inspired in Neer her love for scholarly endeavors. She graduated with honors from Bronxville High School in 1955, being awarded a Regent’s college scholarship by the State Education Department. Eva Augenblick attended Radcliffe College and graduated from Barnard College in 1959. A list of student acquaintances of hers at high school and college would include notable achievers such as economist Fischer Black, psychologist Robert L. Helmreich, and endocrinologist Robert M. Neer whom she married.
Neer graduated as a physician at Columbia University in 1963. Three years later, she joined Harvard University where she worked continuously for more than three decades. Neer has been singled out for her "efforts to help women advance up the academic ladder". She died of complications from breast cancer in 2000, survived by her husband and two sons, Robert and Richard. A personal account of Neer´s professional life was given by her close colleague David E. Clapham in an obituary note.

Academic career
Neer joined Harvard research staff in 1966. She was appointed Assistant Professor of Medicine in 1976, and full professor in 1991. She was ascribed to the Cardiology Division at Brigham and Women's Hospital. Neer served on the Board of Tutors in Biochemical Sciences at Harvard College, as well as on the Harvard Students Research Committee at the Harvard Medical School. She combined the tools of chemistry, biology, physics and molecular biology to explain how cells interpret the messages they get from light, hormones and neurotransmitters. The author of numerous papers, she was elected to both the U.S. National Academy of Sciences and the Institute of Medicine of the National Academy of Sciences and earned membership in the American Academy of Arts and Sciences and the Polish Institute of Arts and Sciences of America. She was honored with the FASEB prize for basic research in 1987 and the American Heart Association’s basic research prize in 1996. She was also an adviser to the National Institutes of Health.

Research
Neer's early research, performed under the guidance of Guido Guidotti, was devoted to study aspects of hemoglobin chemistry. These included the role of sulfhydryl groups of α and β chains on the quaternary conformation of the molecule. She showed their importance in subunit interface interaction and functional cooperativity for oxygen binding. This binding is an essential property for oxygen transport in blood and is often referred as Bohr effect.

While still at Guidotti's lab, Neer undertook independent research on the biochemical mechanisms of vasopressin's action on kidney's distal tubules. She described the purification and kinetic properties of vasopressin-sensitive adenylate cyclase from rat renal medulla.  It would be later shown that vasopressin  acts through a G protein-coupled receptor. This was the topic of Neer's work for most of her research career.

In order to dissect out different aspects of G protein messaging complexities Neer studied a variety of tissues including brain cortex, rat testis, pigeon erythrocytes, heart, brain, retina-rods. Some of her most cited research findings include:

Purification and properties of free and membrane-bound adenylate cyclase (1978)
Size and detergent binding of adenylate cyclase from bovine cerebral cortex (1978)
The site of α-chymotryptic activation of pigeon erythrocyte adenylate cyclase (1978)
Calmodulin activates the isolated catalytic unit of brain adenylate cyclase (1981)
Location and function of reactive sulfhydryl groups of α subunit 39 (1987)
Action of G protein subunits on the cardiac muscarinic K+ channel (1987, 1988)
Cloning and differential expression of α-subunit types in human tissues and cell types (1988)
G-protein αs and αo synthesis in GH3 cells (1996)
Structure-function aspects of activation of PLC by G protein subunits: site mutation studies. (1998)

During the course of her career Neer authored a number of highly cited review articles on structural and functional aspects of G protein and its subunits.

Awards and honors

Damon Runyon Fellowship from the Cancer Research Foundation in 1973
American Heart Association Research Achievement Award for Basic Research (1996) together with David E. Clapham
FASEB Excellence in Science Award 1998
Elected to the National Academy of Sciences 1998
Elected to the Institute of Medicine of the National Academy of Sciences 1998
Earned membership in the American Academy of Arts and Sciences 1997
Posthumously honored by Harvard Medical School by establishing the Eva Neer Memorial Lecture

References

External links 
 MOLECULAR MIDDLEMEN
 Eva Neer papers, 1960-2002 (inclusive), 1980-1999 (bulk). H MS c391. Harvard Medical Library, Francis A. Countway Library of Medicine, Boston, Mass.
 Robert Neer, Thomas Michel, and Robert J. Lefkowitz, "Eva J. Neer", Biographical Memoirs of the National Academy of Sciences (2021)

1937 births
2000 deaths
American women biochemists
Columbia University Vagelos College of Physicians and Surgeons alumni
Barnard College alumni
20th-century American women scientists
20th-century American chemists
People from Queens, New York
People from Scarsdale, New York
Members of the National Academy of Medicine
Scientists from Warsaw